A historical atlas is a collection of maps and possibly illustrations that depict the historical geography of a particular region at a defined time period. These atlases typically include maps that show the political and cultural boundaries of different states as well as other data, and in some cases illustrations that provide information about important historical events and figures. They may also include timelines, charts, and other information to help readers understand the historical context of the maps. Historical atlases are used by scholars, students, and general readers to study and learn about the past. 

Some try to present the entire history of the world, such as the Historical Atlas of the World, while others are more specialised, for only one time period or location, such as the Historical Atlas of the American West or The Historical Atlas of China. 

The first known historical atlas may have been the Parergon by Abraham Ortelius in 1579, which was a supplement to the Theatrum Orbis Terrarum. William R. Shepherd produced a well-known historical atlas in 1911.

References

External links

Individual digitised historical atlases
 F. W. Putzgers Historischer Schul-Atlas, Ausgabe von 1905
 F. W. Putzgers Historischer Schul-Atlas, Ausgabe von 1914
 Richard Andree: Professor G. Droysens Allgemeiner Historischer Handatlas, 1886
 R. Lane Poole: Historical Atlas of Modern Europe, 1900
 Geschichtlicher Atlas von Hessen
 Historischer Atlas von Sachsen (1815)
 Maps from the 'Imperial Gazetteer of India' (ein Angebot der 'Digital South Asia Library')
 Joseph E. Schwartzberg, A Historical Atlas of South Asia, second impression.
 Geschichtskarten zum Islam
 Digitalisierungsprojekt Wilhelmshöher Kriegskarten

Digital only projects
 Omniatlas - Interactive Atlas of World History
 Running Reality - any day in history
 Centennia Historical Atlas
 Some animated maps
 Digital historical maps from the Institut für Europäische Geschichte, Mainz, Germany

Other
 Maps and History. Constructing Images of the Past